Yonezawa (written:  or ) is a Japanese surname. Notable people with the surname include:

Akinori Yonezawa (born 1947), Japanese computer scientist
, Japanese footballer
Honobu Yonezawa (born 1978), Japanese writer
, Japanese voice actress and singer
Takeshi Yonezawa (born 1969), Japanese footballer
, Japanese tennis player
Yoshihiro Yonezawa (1953-2006), Japanese manga author

Japanese-language surnames